Julius Charles Berninghaus (May 19, 1905 – January 1, 1988) was an American painter from New Mexico.

References

1905 births
1988 deaths
School of the Art Institute of Chicago alumni
Art Students League of New York alumni
Artists from Taos, New Mexico
American male painters
Painters from New Mexico
20th-century American painters
20th-century American male artists